The Royal Arcade, in the upscale shopping district of Mayfair, London is an historic Victorian era shopping arcade that runs from 12 Albemarle Street to 28 Old Bond Street. Completed in 1880, it was designed by architects Archer & Green and is Grade II listed.

History 
Development of an arcade in the area was originally proposed in 1864 as a longer link between Old Bond Street and Regent Street, but was rejected due to the scale of proposed demolition and restriction of access to existing properties. A subsequent redesigned proposal was submitted with its current layout, and the arcade as it appears today opening in 1880. In part it replaced the Clarendon Hotel, which had been demolished in 1870.

With its saddled glass roof, richly decorated stucco arches, curved glass shop fronts and Ionic columns, the arcade has changed little in the intervening 138 years and retains all its original features, making it a rare original Victorian arcade.

As is evident from the highly decorative stucco facades at either end, it was originally called The Arcade. It acquired its royal prefix when shirtmaker H. W. Brettell was patronised by Queen Victoria in the early 1880s. William Hodgson Brettell opened his shirtmakers in The Arcade in 1880 (aged 24) and occupied number 12, where Ormonde Jayne Perfumers are based today.

Edward Goodyear, another original Royal Warrant holder and still in business today, was forced to relocate after being bombed out during The Blitz in 1940.

The Royal Arcade continues its reputation for luxury retail, with the current tenants providing a mix of world-renowned brands and one-off independents. The royal connection is also still in place, as Charbonnel Et Walker, located at Nos 1 & 2, hold the Royal Warrant as chocolatiers to Her Majesty The Queen.

The Royal Arcade has been used as a location for TV and film, including The Parent Trap (1998), Miss Pettigrew Lives for a Day (2008), Balletboyz (2013) for Channel 4 and in 2016 Film Stars Don’t Die in Liverpool. Parts of Agatha Christie's Poirot episode The Theft of the Royal Ruby were also filmed there.

Shops in 2017 
Charbonnel et Walker, 1&2 
Simon Griffen Antiques, 3 
Watch Club, 4&5 
EB Meyrowitz Optician, 6
Calleija Jewellery, 7
Camper, 8-10
Cartujano, 11
Ormonde Jayne, 12 
George Cleverley, 13
Beards Jewellers, 14
Erskine, Hall & Coe, 15

References

External links 
 
 Official website

Grade II listed buildings in the City of Westminster
Buildings and structures in the City of Westminster
Shopping arcades in England
Retail buildings in London
Shopping malls established in 1879
1879 establishments in England
Victorian architecture in England